Papa Khalifa Sankaré (born 15 August 1984) is a Senegalese former professional footballer who plays as a central defender.

Club career

Early career
Sankaré was born in Dakar, Senegal. He started his football career at AS Douanes but moved to French team US Boulogne in 2003, and appeared with the latter's first team during the 2005–06 and 2006–07 seasons. In July 2007 he was transferred to Belgian club S.V. Zulte Waregem, but spent the majority of his spell on loan at K.V. Oostende and R.A.E.C. Mons.

Greece
In July 2010, Sankaré transferred to Greek team Olympiacos Volou. He made his debut for the club on 28 August, starting in a 1–0 away win against Panionios, and subsequently established himself as a regular starter at the club.

In the 2011 summer, after Olympiacos' relegation due to a match-fixing scandal, Sankaré was released by the club and joined Aris Thessaloniki in the same division. He scored his first goal for Aris on his debut, netting the first in a 1–1 draw at Ergotelis.

Sankaré joined Super League side Asteras Tripolis from Aris on a free transfer in July 2012. He reached fan acclaim by scoring a stunning bicycle kick in the play-off match against PAS Giannina on 15 May 2013.

Kuwait / Asteras Tripolis return
In May 2013, Sankaré joined Kuwaitian club Al-Arabi. In January of the following year, after being rarely used, he returned to his former club Asteras Tripolis, becoming an immediate first-choice.

Sankaré was also an undisputed starter for Asteras during the 2014–15 UEFA Europa League run, which saw the club reach the group stage for the first time in their history. He also scored a goal in a 1–1 away draw against Finnish club RoPS on 17 July 2014.

Cádiz
On 13 August 2016, Sankaré signed a one-year contract with Spanish Segunda División club Cádiz CF.

Honours

Club
Asteras Tripoli
Greek Cup runner-up: 2012–13

References

External links

1984 births
Living people
Footballers from Dakar
Association football defenders
Senegalese footballers
Belgian Pro League players
Challenger Pro League players
Segunda División players
Super League Greece players
US Boulogne players
S.V. Zulte Waregem players
K.V. Oostende players
R.A.E.C. Mons players
Olympiacos Volos F.C. players
Aris Thessaloniki F.C. players
Asteras Tripolis F.C. players
Al-Arabi SC (Kuwait) players
Cádiz CF players
Senegalese expatriate footballers
Senegalese expatriate sportspeople in France
Senegalese expatriate sportspeople in Belgium
Senegalese expatriate sportspeople in Greece
Senegalese expatriate sportspeople in Spain
Expatriate footballers in France
Expatriate footballers in Belgium
Expatriate footballers in Greece
Expatriate footballers in Cyprus
Expatriate footballers in Kuwait
Expatriate footballers in Spain
Senegalese expatriate sportspeople in Kuwait
Kuwait Premier League players